von Appen or Von Appen is a surname. Notable people with the surname include:

Fred von Appen (born 1942), American football player and coach
Henrik von Appen (born 1994), Chilean alpine skier
Karl von Appen (1900–1981), German scenic designer
Mario Von Appen (born 1965), German sprint canoer